Eduard Antonovich Matusevich (born 16 November 1937) is a retired Soviet speed skater who won a gold, a bronze and a silver medal at the European championships in 1965, 1967 and 1968, respectively. He competed at the 1964 and 1968 Winter Olympics in the 1,500 m event and finished in sixth and eighth place, respectively. He was all-round national champion in 1964–1966 and 1966 and won five individual titles in 1963–1966.

His personal bests were 
500 m – 40.6 (1968)
1500 m – 2:04.5 (1968)
5000 m – 7:35.1 (1965)
10000 m – 15:43.6 (1968)

References

1937 births
Living people
Sportspeople from Minsk
Olympic speed skaters of the Soviet Union
Speed skaters at the 1964 Winter Olympics
Speed skaters at the 1968 Winter Olympics
Belarusian male speed skaters
Soviet male speed skaters
Honoured Masters of Sport of the USSR